Prakash Velayudhan is a cinematographer from Kerala, predominantly working in Malayalam films.

Filmography

References

Indian cinematographers